Anthurium cupulispathum is a species of Anthurium found in Ecuador and Colombia at elevations of 600 to 3300 meters. A. cupulispathum is in section Belolonchium of the genus.

References

External links

Flora of Ecuador
Flora of Colombia
Plants described in 1995
cupulispathum